Bernard Edward Pauncefort, OBE (8 April 1926 – 14 July 2010) was a British colonial administrator and diplomat. He was Administrator of Ascension from 1980 to 1982, which included the period when Ascension was used as a base during the Falklands War.

He later served as Administrator of Tristan da Cunha from 1989 to 1992.

References 
 https://www.ukwhoswho.com/view/10.1093/ww/9780199540891.001.0001/ww-9780199540884-e-30293

British colonial governors and administrators in Oceania
British diplomats
1926 births
2010 deaths